Menace to Society can refer to:

 Menace to Society (Lizzy Borden album), 1986
 Menace to Society (Killers album), 1994
 Menace II Society, a 1993 film
 Menace II Society (soundtrack), the soundtrack album for the film

See also
 Menace to Sobriety (disambiguation)
 Anti-social behaviour